Daniel Thompson (born 25 November 1993) is an English footballer who last played for Whitehawk. He is a striker.

Career

Hampton & Richmond
Thompson started his career at Hampton & Richmond Borough. He made his debut with only 16 years old, on 12 March 2011, against Weston-super-Mare. He scored his first career goal three days later, against Woking. His success at the club earned him trials at Stoke City in July, Newcastle, Crystal Palace in October and Queens Park Rangers.

Portsmouth and loans
On 5 January 2012, Thompson signed for Portsmouth, in a one-year scholarship deal. This caused concern for Hampton & Richmond as they expected compensation.

After his signing to Portsmouth, Thompson joined Havant & Waterlooville on loan until the end of the season, to gain first-team experience. 
He made a total of 13 appearances (12 league matches and 1 was a friendly against Bournemouth).

After the end of the season, Thompson was promoted to the Portsmouth first team. And made his debut on 14 August, starting in a EFL Cup match against Plymouth Argyle. Due to an increase in players, Thompson was relegated to the Development squad. On 29 October 2012, he scored 4 goals against Gosport, in a friendly match for the Development squad. Despite his performance against Gosport, the manager Guy Whittingham ruled out his involvement in first team squad, due to 20-man shortage. 
On 21 November 2012, Thompson joined Dorchester Town on an initial month-long loan, alongside George Colson. Thompson made his debut in a FA Trophy match against Luton Town coming on as a substitute in the 78th minute, the match ended in a 2–2 draw.

In January 2013 Thompson signed for Isthmian Premier Division side Bognor Regis Town on a month-long loan.

In March, Thompson was told that his Pompey contract would not be renewed. After his return to Pompey, he was released.

Return to Non-League
In July, Thompson returned to Hampton & Richmond Borough, making his re-debut for the club on 25 September, against Wingate & Finchley.

In December 2013, he joined Conference South side Hayes and Yeading United, but he was already departed by their first match of 2014.

He re-signed for Bognor Regis Town in February 2014, and Farnborough in August 2014.

In September 2014 he was back Bognor Regis for his third spell, then Redhill in January 2015, Hampton & Richmond Borough once again over the summer of 2015, Walton & Hersham in September 2015, Bedfont Sports in October 2015, Hampton & Richmond Borough again in November 2015, Chipstead in December 2015, and back at Hampton & Richmond Borough in January 2016.

After being part of the Hampton & Richmond Borough squad that won the 2015–16 Isthmian League Premier Division, he joined Burgess Hill Town in August 2016 after a successful trial. He moved to Tonbridge Angels om January 2017. In February 2018, manager Steve McKimm released him along with two other players. Just over a week later, he signed for Braintree Town, where he won promotion to the National League. Thompson made 9 appearances for Braintree following promotion, but following a change of manager, his opportunities became limited. He signed for Dulwich Hamlet in December 2018.

In June 2019, Thompson joined Kingstonian. He moved to East Grinstead Town, where he made five appearances before the 2019–20 season was cut short. In May 2021, Thompson moved to Margate. In January 2022, Margate announced Dan had left by mutual consent. He subsequently signed for Whitehawk, scoring once before leaving at the end of the season.

Career statistics
.

References

External links

1994 births
Living people
Footballers from Wandsworth
English footballers
Association football forwards
Hampton & Richmond Borough F.C. players
Portsmouth F.C. players
Havant & Waterlooville F.C. players
Dorchester Town F.C. players
Bognor Regis Town F.C. players
Hayes & Yeading United F.C. players
Farnborough F.C. players
Redhill F.C. players
Walton & Hersham F.C. players
Bedfont Sports F.C. players
Chipstead F.C. players
Burgess Hill Town F.C. players
Tonbridge Angels F.C. players
Braintree Town F.C. players
Dulwich Hamlet F.C. players
Kingstonian F.C. players
East Grinstead Town F.C. players
Margate F.C. players
Whitehawk F.C. players
National League (English football) players
Southern Football League players
Isthmian League players